Mordechai-Haim Stern (born 16 October 1914, died 21 February 1975) was an Israeli politician who served as a member of the Knesset for Gahal between 1965 and 1969.

Biography
Born in Vienna in Austria-Hungary, Stern studied medicine at the University of Vienna, but did not graduate. In 1934 he made aliyah to Mandatory Palestine. He worked at the Anglo-Palestine Bank, where he became a senior executive, and was involved in transferring Jewish assets out of Nazi Germany. He also worked for the Mandate authorities as an income tax supervisor. In 1945 he became a deputy director of the Rassco housing company, a post he held until 1957 when he became a director. He remained a director until 1970.

In 1942 Stern was amongst the founders of the New Aliyah Party, which later merged into the Progressive Party, of which he was a member of the board of directors. In 1959 he became a member of Tel Aviv city council. As the Progressive Party merged into the Liberal Party, which in turn formed the Gahal alliance, Stern was elected to the Knesset on the Gahal list in 1965, but lost his seat in the 1969 elections.

He died in 1975 at the age of 60.

References

External links

1914 births
1975 deaths
Austrian Jews
Austrian emigrants to Mandatory Palestine
Israeli civil servants
Israeli bankers
20th-century Israeli businesspeople
New Aliyah Party politicians
Progressive Party (Israel) politicians
Liberal Party (Israel) politicians
Gahal politicians
Members of the 6th Knesset (1965–1969)